Aleksey Igorevich Vasilyev (born 13 January 1972) is a Russian auto racing driver.

Career
Vasilyev began karting in 1984 and raced primarily in his native Soviet Union for the majority of his early career, finishing as runner-up in the USSR championship in 1989. From 1990 to 2000 he raced in Russian touring car championships, winning three championship titles in the Tourism-1600 category.

In 2000 he debuted internationally, competing in the N-GT class of the FIA GT Championship for Freisinger Motorsport alongside another Russian driver Nikolai Fomenko. After the 2001 season, he and Fomenko switched to RWS Motorsport for next two successive years. In 2002, Vasilyev scored his first point at Donington.

By 2004 he returned to Freisinger Motorsport, scoring his first podium at Magny-Cours and placed sixth in the final championship standings; his best result in the N-GT class. Vasilyev also debuted with Freisinger in the new-for-2004 Le Mans Endurance Series, and the 24 Hours of Le Mans.

Vasilyev graduated to the new GT1 class in 2005 with Russian Age Racing, and again competed in the Le Mans Endurance Series, where he finished third in the GT class with the Convers Team. He finished in fifth place in the GT1 class at Le Mans; his best result at the race. Vasilyev also contested the British round of the inaugural A1 Grand Prix season.

In 2006 Vasilyev made his debut in the Dakar Rally, in the car class. He finished second in the Le Mans Series GT1 standings,. before switching to the GT2 class in 2008, returning to the Le Mans Series with Snoras Spyker Squadron. He had competed in the Ferrari Challenge in 2007, and remained in the series until the end of 2011. In 2010 he participated under a Lithuanian racing licence, after his Russian licence was disqualified due to unsporting behaviour. Vasilyev signed with Valmon Racing Team Russia for the 2012 FIA GT1 World Championship season.

Racing record

Career summary

24 Hours of Le Mans results

Complete GT1 World Championship results

References

External links
 Career statistics from Driver Database

1972 births
Living people
Russian racing drivers
24 Hours of Le Mans drivers
A1 Team Russia drivers
European Le Mans Series drivers
FIA GT1 World Championship drivers
Dakar Rally drivers
FIA GT Championship drivers
24 Hours of Spa drivers
Blancpain Endurance Series drivers
Sportspeople from Moscow
24H Series drivers